Maksud Syundyukle (real name - Sadyk Mubinovich Maksudov , September 2, 1904 – October 23, 1981) - Tatar and Bashkir poet, translator. Member of the Writers' Union of the Bashkir ASSR. Honored Worker of Culture of the Bashkir ASSR.

Biography 
Maksud Syundyukle (Sadyk Mubinovich Maksudov) was born on September 2 (15), 1904 in the village of Syundyukovo (now Tetyushsky District, Tatarstan).

He received his primary education in the madrasah of his native village. In 1924, Sadyk Mubinovich went to the Donbas, where he began his working life as a laborer of the 1st mine of the “Artemugol(ru)” in the city of Artemovsk. In 1925-1927 he studied at the Soviet party school in Artemovsk, after graduation, worked for three years as a teacher at the Shcherbinovsky mine, eliminated illiteracy among workers of Tatar and Bashkir nationalities
  
Member of the CPSU since 1930. In 1931-1935 he worked as a literary employee in the Tatar newspaper “Пролетар” (“Proletarian”, Donetsk)

In 1935, at the invitation of the writer Daut Yultiy(ru), Maksud Syundyukle moved to Bashkortostan and since that time had been living in the city of Ufa. Here he worked as a journalist and literary employee of the Republican Radio Committee under the Council of People's Commissars of the Bashkir ASSR. Member of the Writers' Union of the Bashkir ASSR(ru) since 1937.

In 1941-43, Maksud Syundyukle served in the ranks of the Red Army, participated in the battles of the Great Patriotic War. After the war, he worked as a literary employee of the editorial team of the journal “Әдәби Башкортостан(ru)” and national newspapers.

In 1971, the name of the poet was entered in the Ufa city book of honor. In 1975, Maksud Syundyukle was awarded the title “Honored Worker of Culture of the Bashkir ASSR”.

He died on October 23, 1981 in Ufa. On the house on the Blucher Street 6/1, where he lived, a memorial plaque was installed. The poet’s grave is in the Muslim cemetery.

Creative activity 
M. Syundyukle's interest in literature aroused when he began attending a literary circle at the “Zaboy” (“Slaughtering”) magazine under the guidance of the famous writer Boris Gorbatov. Then in 1925, his first poems appeared, published by the newspaper “Этче” (“Worker”) and the magazine “Ять этче” (“Young Worker”), published in Tatar in Moscow

The first collections of poems by M. Syundyukle were “The Voice of Coal” (“Күмер тавышы”, 1930), “Mine is Breathing” (“Шахта сулый”, 1931), “Udarniks of Donbas” (“Донбасс ударниклары”, 1931), “Song of Donbas” (“Донбасс турында жыр”, 1932).

He wrote poems about the working class, labor exploits, about Salawat Yulayev, poems for children (“Beautiful Ural” (“Красив Урал”), etc.). One of his poems was dedicated to Alexey Stakhanov, whom he personally knew.

The poem “Makar Mazay(ru)” (Макар Мазай, 1951), which depicts the heroism of Soviet man during the years of World War II, became a significant stage in the poet’s work. This work became a noticeable phenomenon in Bashkir literature of that time and was highly appreciated by famous Soviet writers and critics during the Decade of Bashkir literature and art in Moscow(ru) in 1955. No less famous is the poem about the fate of the Ufa revolutionary Ivan Yakutov(ru) (1959).

Maksud Syundyukle is also known as a translator of the works of Alexander Pushkin, Mikhail Lermontov, Robert Burns, Mikhail Isakovsky and others, including the translation of the poems “Vasily Terkin” by Aleksandr Tvardovsky  and  "The Twelve" by Alexander Blok into the Bashkir language

Maksud Syundyukle wrote his works in the Bashkir and Tatar languages, his poems were also published in Russian (translation by Nikolai Milovanov), Ukrainian (translation by Valentin Lagoda(uk)) and Kazakh. He is the author of 53 books that have been published in Ufa, Kazan, Moscow and Donetsk.

Composer Kamil Rakhimov(ru) wrote the songs “Summer Morning”  (“Летнее утро”, 1946), “On the Bank of Dyoma”  (“На берегу Дёмы”, 1952), “Cantata about Friendship” (“Кантата о дружбе”, 1957) to the words of Maksud Syundyukle.

Family 
All his life since 1932, Maksud Syundyukle lived in the marriage with Chanysheva Hanifa Shaimardanovna (1912-1985), whom he met around 1930, when she came from Bashkortostan to work in the Donbas. Children: daughter Nelya (Неля, 1937-2017, the wife of the literary critic Marat Mingazhetdinov(ru)), sons Rustem (Рустем, 1935-2017) and Vil' (Виль, 1939).

Most famous works

In the Tatar language

In Russian and Bashkir languages

In the Ukrainian language

References

Sources

External links
 
 
 
 
 

1981 deaths
Soviet poets
Bashkir writers
Tatar writers
1904 births
Socialist realism writers
Bashkir-language poets
20th-century pseudonymous writers